A mathematician is someone who uses an extensive knowledge of mathematics in their work, typically to solve mathematical problems.
Mathematicians are concerned with numbers, data, quantity, structure, space, models, and change.

History

One of the earliest known mathematicians were Thales of Miletus (c. 624–c.546 BC); he has been hailed as the first true mathematician and the first known individual to whom a mathematical discovery has been attributed. He is credited with the first use of deductive reasoning applied to geometry, by deriving four corollaries to Thales' Theorem.

The number of known mathematicians grew when Pythagoras of Samos (c. 582–c. 507 BC) established the Pythagorean School, whose doctrine it was that mathematics ruled the universe and whose motto was "All is number". It was the Pythagoreans who coined the term "mathematics", and with whom the study of mathematics for its own sake begins.

The first woman mathematician recorded by history was Hypatia of Alexandria (AD 350 – 415). She succeeded her father as Librarian at the Great Library and wrote many works on applied mathematics. Because of a political dispute, the Christian community in Alexandria punished her, presuming she was involved, by stripping her naked and scraping off her skin with clamshells (some say roofing tiles).

Science and mathematics in the Islamic world during the Middle Ages followed various models and modes of funding varied based primarily on scholars. It was extensive patronage and strong intellectual policies implemented by specific rulers that allowed scientific knowledge to develop in many areas. Funding for translation of scientific texts in other languages was ongoing throughout the reign of certain caliphs, and it turned out that certain scholars became experts in the works they translated and in turn received further support for continuing to develop certain sciences. As these sciences received wider attention from the elite, more scholars were invited and funded to study particular sciences. An example of a translator and mathematician who benefited from this type of support was al-Khawarizmi. A notable feature of many scholars working under Muslim rule in medieval times is that they were often polymaths. Examples include the work on optics, maths and astronomy of Ibn al-Haytham.

The Renaissance brought an increased emphasis on mathematics and science to Europe. During this period of transition from a mainly feudal and ecclesiastical culture to a predominantly secular one, many notable mathematicians had other occupations: Luca Pacioli (founder of accounting); Niccolò Fontana Tartaglia (notable engineer and bookkeeper); Gerolamo Cardano (earliest founder of probability and binomial expansion); Robert Recorde (physician) and François Viète (lawyer).

As time passed, many mathematicians gravitated towards universities. An emphasis on free thinking and experimentation had begun in Britain's oldest universities beginning in the seventeenth century at Oxford with the scientists Robert Hooke and Robert Boyle, and at Cambridge where Isaac Newton was Lucasian Professor of Mathematics & Physics. Moving into the 19th century, the objective of universities all across Europe evolved from teaching the "regurgitation of knowledge" to "encourag[ing] productive thinking." In 1810, Humboldt convinced the King of Prussia, Fredrick William III to build a university in Berlin based on Friedrich Schleiermacher's liberal ideas; the goal was to demonstrate the process of the discovery of knowledge and to teach students to "take account of fundamental laws of science in all their thinking." Thus, seminars and laboratories started to evolve.

British universities of this period adopted some approaches familiar to the Italian and German universities, but as they already enjoyed substantial freedoms and autonomy the changes there had begun with the Age of Enlightenment, the same influences that inspired Humboldt. The Universities of Oxford and Cambridge emphasized the importance of research, arguably more authentically implementing Humboldt's idea of a university than even German universities, which were subject to state authority. Overall, science (including mathematics) became the focus of universities in the 19th and 20th centuries. Students could conduct research in seminars or laboratories and began to produce doctoral theses with more scientific content. According to Humboldt, the mission of the University of Berlin was to pursue scientific knowledge. The German university system fostered professional, bureaucratically regulated scientific research performed in well-equipped laboratories, instead of the kind of research done by private and individual scholars in Great Britain and France. In fact, Rüegg asserts that the German system is responsible for the development of the modern research university because it focused on the idea of "freedom of scientific research, teaching and study."

Required education
Mathematicians usually cover a breadth of topics within mathematics in their undergraduate education, and then proceed to specialize in topics of their own choice at the graduate level. In some universities, a qualifying exam serves to test both the breadth and depth of a student's understanding of mathematics; the students, who pass, are permitted to work on a doctoral dissertation.

Activities

Applied mathematics

Mathematicians involved with solving problems with applications in real life are called applied mathematicians. Applied mathematicians are mathematical scientists who, with their specialized knowledge and professional methodology, approach many of the imposing problems presented in related scientific fields. With professional focus on a wide variety of problems, theoretical systems, and localized constructs, applied mathematicians work regularly in the study and formulation of mathematical models. Mathematicians and applied mathematicians are considered to be two of the STEM (science, technology, engineering, and mathematics) careers.

The discipline of applied mathematics concerns itself with mathematical methods that are typically used in science, engineering, business, and industry; thus, "applied mathematics" is a mathematical science with specialized knowledge. The term "applied mathematics" also describes the professional specialty in which mathematicians work on problems, often concrete but sometimes abstract. As professionals focused on problem solving, applied mathematicians look into the formulation, study, and use of mathematical models in science, engineering, business, and other areas of mathematical practice.

Pure mathematics

Pure mathematics is mathematics that studies entirely abstract concepts. From the eighteenth century onwards, this was a recognized category of mathematical activity, sometimes characterized as speculative mathematics, and at variance with the trend towards meeting the needs of navigation, astronomy, physics, economics, engineering, and other applications.

Another insightful view put forth is that pure mathematics is not necessarily applied mathematics: it is possible to study abstract entities with respect to their intrinsic nature, and not be concerned with how they manifest in the real world. Even though the pure and applied viewpoints are distinct philosophical positions, in practice there is much overlap in the activity of pure and applied mathematicians.

To develop accurate models for describing the real world, many applied mathematicians draw on tools and techniques that are often considered to be "pure" mathematics. On the other hand, many pure mathematicians draw on natural and social phenomena as inspiration for their abstract research.

Mathematics teaching
Many professional mathematicians also engage in the teaching of mathematics. Duties may include:
 teaching university mathematics courses;
 supervising undergraduate and graduate research; and
 serving on academic committees.

Consulting
Many careers in mathematics outside of universities involve consulting. For instance, actuaries assemble and analyze data to estimate the probability and likely cost of the occurrence of an event such as death, sickness, injury, disability, or loss of property. Actuaries also address financial questions, including those involving the level of pension contributions required to produce a certain retirement income and the way in which a company should invest resources to maximize its return on investments in light of potential risk. Using their broad knowledge, actuaries help design and price insurance policies, pension plans, and other financial strategies in a manner which will help ensure that the plans are maintained on a sound financial basis.

As another example, mathematical finance will derive and extend the mathematical or numerical models without necessarily establishing a link to financial theory, taking observed market prices as input. Mathematical consistency is required, not compatibility with economic theory. Thus, for example, while a financial economist might study the structural reasons why a company may have a certain share price, a financial mathematician may take the share price as a given, and attempt to use stochastic calculus to obtain the corresponding value of derivatives of the stock (see: Valuation of options; Financial modeling).

Occupations 

According to the Dictionary of Occupational Titles occupations in mathematics include the following.

 Mathematician
 Operations-Research Analyst
 Mathematical Statistician
 Mathematical Technician
 Actuary
 Applied Statistician
 Weight Analyst

Prizes in mathematics 
There is no Nobel Prize in mathematics, though sometimes mathematicians have won the Nobel Prize in a different field, such as economics or physics. Prominent prizes in mathematics include the Abel Prize, the Chern Medal, the Fields Medal, the Gauss Prize, the Nemmers Prize, the Balzan Prize, the Crafoord Prize, the Shaw Prize, the Steele Prize, the Wolf Prize, the Schock Prize, and the Nevanlinna Prize.

The American Mathematical Society, Association for Women in Mathematics, and other mathematical societies offer several prizes aimed at increasing the representation of women and minorities in the future of mathematics.

Mathematical autobiographies
Several well known mathematicians have written autobiographies in part to explain to a general audience what it is about mathematics that has made them want to devote their lives to its study. These provide some of the best glimpses into what it means to be a mathematician. The following list contains some works that are not autobiographies, but rather essays on mathematics and mathematicians with strong autobiographical elements.

 The Book of My Life – Girolamo Cardano
 A Mathematician's Apology - G.H. Hardy
 A Mathematician's Miscellany (republished as Littlewood's miscellany) - J. E. Littlewood
 I Am a Mathematician - Norbert Wiener
 I Want to be a Mathematician - Paul R. Halmos
 Adventures of a Mathematician - Stanislaw Ulam
 Enigmas of Chance - Mark Kac
 Random Curves - Neal Koblitz
 Love and Math - Edward Frenkel
 Mathematics Without Apologies - Michael Harris

See also 

 Lists of mathematicians
 Human computer
 Mathematical joke
 A Mathematician's Apology
 Men of Mathematics (book)
 Mental calculator
 Timeline of ancient Greek mathematicians

Notes

Bibliography

Further reading

External links

 Occupational Outlook: Mathematicians. Information on the occupation of mathematician from the US Department of Labor.
 Sloan Career Cornerstone Center: Careers in Mathematics. Although US-centric, a useful resource for anyone interested in a career as a mathematician. Learn what mathematicians do on a daily basis, where they work, how much they earn, and more.
 The MacTutor History of Mathematics archive. A comprehensive list of detailed biographies.
 The Mathematics Genealogy Project. Allows scholars to follow the succession of thesis advisors for most mathematicians, living or dead.
 
 Middle School Mathematician Project Short biographies of select mathematicians assembled by middle school students.
 Career Information for Students of Math and Aspiring Mathematicians from MathMajor

.